Gavicalis is a genus of honeyeaters endemic to New Guinea and Australia. It contains former members of Lichenostomus, and was created after a molecular phylogenetic analysis published in 2011 showed that the original genus was polyphyletic.

The genus contains three species:

The name Gavicalis was first proposed by the Australian ornithologists Richard Schodde and Ian Mason in 1999. The word is an anagram of Caligavis introduced by Tom Iredale.

References

 
Bird genera